There are around 96 villages in Rahuri tehsil of Ahmednagar district of state of Maharashtra. Following is the list of village in Rahuri tehsil.

B
 Babhulgaon
 Barogaon Nandur
 Bodhegaon
 Bramhangaon Bhand
 Bramhani

C
 Chandegaon 
 Cheadgaon
 Chichale
 Chikhalthan (Sheri Chikhalthan)
 Chincholi
 Chinchvihire

D
 Daradgaon Thadi
 Dawangaon
 Deswandi
 Dhamori Bk
 Dhamori Kd
 Dhanore
 Digras
 Deolali Pravara

Gonandpipri
 Ganegaon
 Gangapur
 Ghorpadwadi
 Guha
 Gunjale

J
 Jambhali
 Jatap
 Jogeshwari Akhada

K
 Kanadgaon
 Kangar Bk
 Karajgaon
 Katrad
 Kendal Bk
 Kendal Kd
 Kesapur
 Khadambe Bk
 Khadambe Kd
 Khudasargaon
 Kolewadi
 Kolhar Kd
 Kondhawad
 Kopare
 Kukkadwedhe
 Kuranwadi

L
 Lakh

M
 Mahegaon
 Malharwadi
 Malunje khurd
 Manjari
 Manori
 Mhaisagaon
 Mokal Ohol
 Momin Akhada
 Musalwadi

N
 Nimbhere

P
 Pathare Kd
 
 Pimpalgaon Funagi
 Pimpari Walan
 Pimpri Awaghad

R
 Rahuri Kd
 Rampur
 Rahuri factory

S
 Sade in mahadevadi
 Sankrapur
 Satral
 Shilegaon
 Songaon

T
 Taharabad
 Tamnar Akhada
 Tambhere
 Tandulner
 Tandulwadi
 Tilapur
 Tulapur
 Takalimiya
 Tilapur kakad wadi

U
 Umbare

V
 Vambori

W
 Wadner
 Walan
 Wanjulpoie
 Warath
 Warshinde
 Warvandi

See also
 Rahuri tehsil
 Tehsils in Ahmednagar
 Villages in Akole tehsil
 Villages in Jamkhed tehsil
 Villages in Karjat tehsil
 Villages in Kopargaon tehsil
 Villages in Nagar tehsil
 Villages in Nevasa tehsil
 Villages in Parner tehsil
 Villages in Pathardi tehsil
 Villages in Rahata tehsil
 Villages in Sangamner tehsil
 Villages in Shevgaon tehsil
 Villages in Shrigonda tehsil
 Villages in Shrirampur tehsil

References

 
Rahuri